The Bolton Center Historic District is the historic center of the town of Bolton, Massachusetts.  The district encompasses what is essentially a linear town center, strung out principally along Main Street (Massachusetts Route 117), with a well-preserved collection of residential and civic architecture spanning more than two centuries.  The district was listed on the National Register of Historic Places in 1996.

Description and history
Although the town's first meetinghouse (built c. 1740 and no longer extant) lay outside the current center, by the early 19th century the town's focus had moved to the main east-west road through the town (now Route 117), where it developed as a major stagecoach stop, with several inns and taverns serving travelers and local business.  By 1830, the center had achieved much of its present appearance, with most of the later development either replacing older buildings or infilling between others.

The district includes a variety of houses from the 18th century onward, including the house of the first town minister (c. 1741, 752 Main Street).  Institutional buildings in the district include the 1853 Town House, four historic school buildings (including an 1825 one room schoolhouse), and the 1928 Colonial Revival Federated Church of Bolton.  Architecturally distinguished buildings include the Tudor Revival library, built in 1903 as a gift from the Whitney family, and the 1923 Elementary School, a fine example of Colonial Revival architecture.

See also
National Register of Historic Places listings in Worcester County, Massachusetts

References

External links
Town of Bolton, MA - desc. of historic district

Bolton, Massachusetts
Historic districts in Worcester County, Massachusetts
National Register of Historic Places in Worcester County, Massachusetts
Historic districts on the National Register of Historic Places in Massachusetts